The following is a list of episodes for the Australian television talk show programme, Can of Worms.

The first series was hosted by Ian "Dicko" Dickson and Meshel Laurie. The second and third series, hosted by Chrissie Swan and Dan Ilic, with James Mathison stepping in for Chrissie for 2 episodes of Season 3 during her maternity leave.

Series overview

Episodes

Season 1 (2011)

Season 2 (2012)

Season 3 (2013)
Can of Worms was renewed for a third series on October 23, 2012. Chrissie Swan returned as host, with the series being broadcast live for the first six episodes.

References

Lists of Australian non-fiction television series episodes